The Amsdorfians were an early sect of Protestant Christians, who took their name from the 16th-century German reformer Nicolaus von Amsdorf. They maintained that good works were not only unprofitable, but obstacles, to salvation. The Amsdorfians were rigid confessionists.

References

Charles Buck, Theological Dictionary

Protestant denominations established in the 16th century